Tecali de Herrera is a town and municipality in Puebla state, southeastern Mexico.

Town

It is center of onyx artisan objects production in Mexico. The Municipal Market Onyx is supplied by the local union craftsmen.

History

Pre-Columbian
Tecali was one of the most important cities of the Toltec−Chichimeca nobility, in the pre-Columbian era. It is registered in the "Matricula de Tributos" made during the time of Moctezuma. In the Nahuatl language the name Tecali derives fromtetl (stone) and calli (house), meaning 'where the houses of stone are.'

Convent of Tecali de Herrera
The ruins of the Spanish colonial era Convent of Tecali of Herrera (Ex-Convento de Tecali de Herrera) are a designated Cultural Heritage Monument in the municipality. The former Franciscan convent was completed in 1540, in New Spain (colonial México). It was designed in the Colonial Spanish Renaissance style by Diego de Arciniega.

References

External links
Mid-Westerner in Mexico Blog: Tecali de Herrera — images and text.

Municipalities of Puebla
History of Puebla
1545 establishments in New Spain